The Decree of Turda was a 14th century decree by Louis I Anjou of Hungary that granted special privileges to the Transylvanian noblemen.

Background

King Louis I of Hungary stayed in Transylvania for six monthsfrom October to Aprilin 1366. On 28 June 1366, while residing in Torda (present-day Turda), the monarch issued a decree at the request of the Transylvanian noblemen. The latter had informed the King that they "have been suffering, day by day, many troubles because of the evil arts of many malefactors, especially Romanians, ...because of their way of being and their disorderly behaviour". The royal decree granted special privileges to the Transylvanian noblemen "in order to exterminate or remove, from this country, malefactors belonging to any nation. For this purpose, the decree determines the rules of the legal procedure.
On 28 June 1366, while residing in the Transylvanian town of Torda (present-day Turda), Louis enacted a decree to reinforce law and order, regulating some areas of social and public life, administration, criminal law and judicial practice.

The conditions imposed by the decree for maintaining or acceding nobility (in particular, affiliation to the Roman Catholic Church and possession of a royal certificate of donation for the owned land) were to select and limit the noble class over a period of centuries, which in turn accelerated the decline of the Estate of Romanians (Universitas Valachorum).

The decree takes an explicitly negative action against Romanians: propter presumptuosam astuciam diversorum malefactorum, specialiter Olachorum in ipsa terra nostra existencium (…) ad exterminandum seu delendum in ipsa terra malefactores quarumlibet nacionum, signanter Olachorum  - because of the evil arts of many malefactors, especially Romanians, who live in that our country (…) to expel or to exterminate in this country malefactors belonging to any nation, especially Romanians.

This was the first time in Transylvania that discriminatory law enforcement along ethnic cleansing was legally codified.

Historians have not reached a consensual view of the exact circumstances of the issuing of the decree and its main purpose. István Petrovics writes that the mobile way of life of the increasing Romanian population caused their conflicts with the sedentary Hungarians. According to Ioan-Aurel Pop, the decree shows the Romanians' "muted resistance" against the monarch and the noblemen who had attempted to deprive them of their property, especially their inherited estates.

Notes

Sources

Medieval Transylvania
Turda